The Enchanted Forest is an amusement park located in Turner, Oregon, on a small patch of hilly wooded land next to Interstate 5, just south of Salem, Oregon. The park was created and hand built by Roger Tofte over a period of seven years in the late 1960s.  The park first opened to the public in 1971. Early success led to many expansions over the last half-century, mostly built again by Roger Tofte by hand.  The Tofte family still owns and operates the  park, with three generations of the family involved in the day to day operations.  The park sees an average of 200,000 guests a year during the normal six-month-long season.

History
In 2006, the Challenge of Mondor ride was added featuring dragons and monsters. The original 1968 Humpty Dumpty display was damaged in July 2014 and was replaced in August 2014 with a new sculpture of the character.

Attractions
The park is divided into various districts that the Tofte's classify as 'Attractions".  Initially opening with just the Storybook Lane, the Tofteville Western Town and Old European Village were added in later expansions. Enchanted Forest also features a "Summer Comedy Theater", which showcases original musical plays based on classic fairy tales, written by Susan Vaslev.

Rides
Augmenting the park are attractions such as the Ice Mountain Bobsleds roller coaster, the Haunted House, and the Big Timber log ride, the largest of its kind in the Pacific Northwest. The Challenge of Mondor is an ETF Ride Systems indoor trackless interactive ride featuring dragons and monsters.

Park schedule

The park is open on a seasonal schedule: opening in late March, weekends only in April, daily from May to Labor Day, and then weekends only through September. 

Due to the COVID-19 pandemic, the park did not adhere to its usual schedule for the 2020 season. The park was able to open daily with reduced capacity beginning June 26 with COVID-19 safety practices in place.

Notes

References

External links

 
The Best of Enchanted Forest - Portland Mercury
Forty Years of Enchanted Forest - "Think Out Loud" on Oregon Public Broadcasting

1971 establishments in Oregon
Amusement parks in Oregon
Companies based in Marion County, Oregon
Historic American Landscapes Survey in Oregon
Tourist attractions in Marion County, Oregon
Turner, Oregon